Erik Alexander Wilson  (born 15 December 1975) is a Norwegian cinematographer. He is best known for his collaborations with the likes of Richard Ayoade, Paul King on the Paddington films, and Will Sharpe. He won a BAFTA for his work on the Sky Atlantic miniseries Landscapers.

Early life
Wilson grew up in Bergen. His mother was a tutor and his father worked in shipping. He has some Scottish heritage, hence his surname. He studied at the London Film School in Covent Garden, beginning his studies in editing before going into cinematography.

Filmography

Film

Documentaries

Television

Music videos

Awards and nominations

Notes

References

External links
 

Living people
1975 births
BAFTA winners (people)
Mass media people from Bergen
Norwegian cinematographers
Norwegian expatriates in England
Norwegian people of Scottish descent